Ja nemam drugi dom (I Have No Other Home) is the eleventh studio album by Yugoslav pop-folk singer Lepa Brena. It was released in December 1993 through the Serbian record label Zabava miliona.

This is her first solo album without the band Slatki Greh.

This album was sold in a circulation of 200,000 copies.

Track listing

Personnel

Production and recording
Željko Mitrović – engineering

Crew
Nikola Kostandinović – design
Zorica Bajin Đukanović – photography

References

1994 albums
Lepa Brena albums
Grand Production albums